{{DISPLAYTITLE:C20H22N2O3}}
The molecular formula C20H22N2O3 (molar mass: 338.400 g/mol, exact mass: 338.1630 u) may refer to:

 Picrinine
 URB597 (KDS-4103)

Molecular formulas